Copacabana: Original London Cast Recording is the original cast album for the London show of Copacabana, a full-length West End musical that opened at the Prince of Wales Theatre on 23 June 1994. It ran for over two years, touring the UK for a further year.

Track listing
(note: all songs written by Barry Manilow, Jack Feldman and Bruce Sussman. Songs with following asterisks are included in the 1985 CBS film.)

Act I

"Overture"* (This Can't Be Real―Night On The Town―Sweet Heaven―Who Needs To Dream?)
"Copacabana (At The Copa) (Opening Sequence)"
"Just Arrived"
"Dancin' Fool"
"Night On The Town"*‡
"Man Wanted"*
"Lola"*
"Who Needs To Dream?"*
"¡Aye Caramba!"*
"Bolero de Amor"
Act II
"Sweet Heaven (I'm In Love Again)"*
"Who Am I Kidding?"
"Who Am I Kidding? (Reprise)"
"This Can't Be Real"
"Welcome to Havana"
"The Mermaid's Tale"
"El Bravo"*
"Who Needs To Dream? (Reprise)"*
"Copacabana (At The Copa) (Finale)"*

‡= "Let's Go Steppin'" becomes "Night On The Town"

References                 

Cast recordings
Barry Manilow
1994 soundtrack albums
Theatre soundtracks